Emil Larsen (born 22 June 1991) is a Danish retired footballer. He most recently played for Lyngby BK in the Danish Superliga, and has played for various Danish national youth teams.

Club career
In his first season as a professional for Lyngby Boldklub, after joining the first team in fall 2009, he gained high praise from coach Niels Frederiksen. Also, there were both domestic and international clubs who showed interest in the young player, especially considering his contract was expiring in 2011.

Larsen became topscorer for the club in the 2009–10 Danish 1st Division campaign, and was therefore a key player in securing promotion to the Danish Superliga. This also meant an increased number of expectations of the young midfielder.

On 9 July 2012, Larsen joined Odense Boldklub on a four-year contract.

He signed with Major League Soccer side Columbus Crew SC on 22 January 2016. After struggling for playing time in the United States, Larsen returned to Denmark on 10 July 2016, signing with his former club Lyngby BK.

On 23 July 2017, Larsen announced his retirement due to a knee injury. He also revealed, that he would continue at the club working as a scout.

References

External links
Denmark national team profile

1991 births
Living people
Footballers from Copenhagen
Danish men's footballers
Association football midfielders
Lyngby Boldklub players
Odense Boldklub players
Columbus Crew players
Danish Superliga players
Major League Soccer players
Denmark youth international footballers
Denmark under-21 international footballers
Denmark international footballers
Footballers at the 2016 Summer Olympics
Olympic footballers of Denmark
Expatriate soccer players in the United States
Danish expatriate men's footballers
Danish expatriate sportspeople in the United States